Himyar is an unincorporated community and coal town in Knox County, Kentucky, United States.

A post office was established in the community in 1906. The town's namesake is the racehorse Himyar, who placed second in the 1878 Kentucky Derby.

References

Unincorporated communities in Knox County, Kentucky
Unincorporated communities in Kentucky
Coal towns in Kentucky